Vladimír Jirásek (2 November 1933 in Hrádek – 14 May 2018) was a Czechoslovak slalom canoeist who competed from the mid-1950s to the mid-1960s. He won seven medals at the ICF Canoe Slalom World Championships with five golds (C-1: 1955, 1959; C-1 team: 1953, 1955, 1959) and two bronzes (C-1: 1953, C-1 team: 1957).

References

1933 births
2018 deaths
Czechoslovak male canoeists
Czech male canoeists
Medalists at the ICF Canoe Slalom World Championships
People from Rokycany District
Sportspeople from the Plzeň Region